Blackpool Aspire Academy is a secondary school located in the Layton area of Blackpool, Lancashire, England.

The school was formed in 2014 by merging Collegiate High School with Bispham High School Arts College. It was temporarily located on Bispham Road until new buildings were constructed on Blackpool Old Road.

School history
The original school at the site was the all-boys Blackpool Grammar School, which had relocated from the original premises on Raikes Parade to Blackpool Old Road in 1961. In 1971 they amalgamated with Collegiate Girls School whose pupils and staff moved to Blackpool Old Road to create Blackpool Collegiate Grammar School. The sixth form moved to a new Sixth Form Centre premises further down Blackpool Old Road also in 1971 and what is now the independent Blackpool Sixth Form College which split from the school in 1989. The school became Collegiate High School in 1974. The last Headteacher was Ms Cordeaux, followed by acting head Mr Topping for a short while. In 2012, the school achieved its best ever results.

Plans to merge Collegiate with Bispham High School Arts College were under discussion 2012–14. The new merged school (named Blackpool Aspire Academy) is sponsored by the Fylde Coast Academy Trust. The school was temporarily housed at the former Bispham High School campus, but relocated to new buildings at the Collegiate site during 2015.

Notable former pupils

Collegiate High School
 Matty Kay, professional footballer
 Matthew Blinkhorn, professional footballer
 Peter Lloyd Jones, PhD, scientist, author, inventor & co-founder of LabStudio at The University of Pennsylvania with Jenny E. Sabin

Blackpool Grammar School
 Ian Anderson, singer, songwriter and multi-instrumentalist, best known for his work as the head of rock band Jethro Tull who played two concerts at the school on 20 December 1965 and 4 April 1966.
 Colin Bradbury, principal clarinet, BBC Symphony Orchestra, 1960-1993
 Alistair Cooke, journalist, television personality and broadcaster
 John Robb, journalist, television personality and broadcaster and musician
 Rt Rev Kenneth Cragg, Anglican clergyman and scholar
 Peter Crampton, Labour Party MEP for Kingston upon Hull, 1989–99
 George Cunningham, Labour and Social Democratic Party MP for Islington South West from 1970 to 1974, and Islington South and Finsbury from 1974 to 1983
 Alfred Gregory, mountain climber, explorer and professional photographer
 Tony Gubba, journalist and sports commentator
 Sir Peter Hall, town planner, urbanist and geographer.
 Jeffrey Hammond, bass guitar player with Jethro Tull
 Arnold W. G. Kean, most notable for his contribution to the development of civil aviation law
 Bernard Langton, President of the Association of Port Health Authorities from 1972 to 1973
 Ernest Mason, World War II flying ace
 Mick McGuire, footballer for clubs including Coventry City and Norwich City
 Eric Mottram, teacher, critic, editor and poet
 Hargreaves Parkinson, Editor of the Financial Times from 1945 to 1950
 John Reynolds, Lord Provost of the City of Aberdeen from 2003 to 2007
 Prof Tom Whiteside, Historian of Mathematics at the University of Cambridge
 Joseph Wright OBE, Chief Executive of the National Pharmaceutical Association from 1961 to 1981
 Rt Rev John Yates, Anglican clergyman. Bishop of Whitby from 1972 to 1975, then Bishop of Gloucester until 1992, and finally Bishop at Lambeth until 1994.

Blackpool Collegiate School for Girls
 Dr Averil Olive Mansfield CBE FRCP (born 21 June 1937)[1] is a retired English vascular surgeon. She was a consultant surgeon at St Mary's Hospital in Paddington, central London, from 1982 to 2002, and in 1993 she became the first British woman to be appointed a professor of surgery.
 Ann Chant CB, Chief Executive of the Contributions Agency from 1991 and the Child Support Agency from 1994 to 1997
 Debbie Mellor (née Clough) OBE Head of the Employment Branch in the HR Directorate of the Dept. of Health
Barbara Robotham, opera singer and voice teacher at the Royal Northern College of Music
 Annie St John, television continuity announcer and presenter.

References

External links
 Blackpool Aspire Academy official website
Former pupils website

Secondary schools in Blackpool
Academies in Blackpool